is a former Japanese football player.

Playing career
Hada was born in Ainan, Ehime on February 20, 1982. After graduating from high school, he joined J1 League club Shimizu S-Pulse in 1996. However he could not play at all in the match behind Masanori Sanada until 2000. From 2001, he battles with newcomer Takaya Kurokawa for the position. Although he played many matches in 2001, his opportunity to play decreased behind Kurokawa from 2002. In 2004, he moved to Cerezo Osaka. However he could not play many matches behind Tomohiko Ito. In 2005, he moved to his local club Ehime FC in Japan Football League. He became a regular goalkeeper and played in all matches in 2005 season. The club also won the champions and was promoted to J2 League from 2006. However his opportunity to play decreased from 2006 season and retired end of 2007 season.

Club statistics

References

External links

1978 births
Living people
Association football people from Ehime Prefecture
Japanese footballers
J1 League players
J2 League players
Japan Football League players
Shimizu S-Pulse players
Cerezo Osaka players
Ehime FC players
Association football goalkeepers